The Chilterns Cycleway consists of a circular 170 mile (274 km) on-road route in the Chilterns Area of Outstanding Natural Beauty Chilterns AONB.

The route runs through the counties of Bedfordshire, Buckinghamshire, Hertfordshire and Oxfordshire.

See also

 Chiltern Way

References

Cycleways in England
Transport in Hertfordshire
Chiltern Hills